Melthonnakkal  is a village in Thiruvananthapuram district in the state of Kerala, India.

Demographics
 India census, Melthonnakkal had a population of 16959 with 8050 males and 8909 females.

References

Villages in Thiruvananthapuram district